Talal Khalifa Al Jeri (born 20 March 1973 in Kuwait) is a Kuwaiti businessman. He is the chairman and CEO of Al Jeri Holding Group, chosen by Forbes in 2018 as a leading educational company.

Since becoming CEO and Chairman of Al Jeri Holding Group in 2004, Al Jeri has purchased several educational companies to form a large consortium, with about 30,000 students and 5,000 employees.
The group also received the award for Best Educational Company from Forbes in 2019.

Awards 
 Business man of the year (Arabian Business Magazine).
 First Educational Character (Forbes Magazine).
 Ranked among the most inspiring leaders in the business world (Arabian Business)

References

1973 births
Kuwaiti businesspeople
People from Kuwait City
21st-century Kuwaiti businesspeople
Living people